Amponsah is a surname. Notable people with the surname include:

 Koffi Amponsah (born 1978), Ghanaian footballer
 Reginald Reynolds Amponsah (1919–2009) Ghanaian potter and politician
 Daniel Amponsah known as Koo Nimo (born 1934), Ghanaian folk musician
 Kwame Amponsah Karikari (or Kwame Karikari) (born 1992), Ghanaian footballer 
 Ophelia Serwaa Amponsah, Ghanaian footballer